Slalåm under himmelen (Slalom beneath the Sky) is a Norwegian drama film from 1957 directed by Edith Carlmar. The filmscript was written by Hans Christensen.

Plot
Three young pilots, who have been trained abroad, return home to Norway, where they begin their professional careers.

Cast

Per Christensen as Second Lieutenant Sigurd Bakke
Marius Eriksen Jr. as Lieutenant Colonel Eriksen
Lisbet Bull as Gerd's aunt
Grace Grung as the nurse
Turid Haaland as Mrs. Riesing, Arne's mother
Jan Halvorsen as Second Lieutenant Thor Granli
Nils Jørstad as Lieutenant Colonel Jørstad
Jan Larsen as Major Moe
Irene Newermann as Sigurd's girlfriend
Rolf Falkenberg Smith as Lieutenant Colonel Bråtland
Synnøve Strigen as Gerd, Thor's fiancé
Anders Sundby as Bakke senior, Sigurd's father
Wilfred Werner as Second Lieutenant Arne Riesing
Ingrid Øvre Wiik as Mrs. Berntsen, Riesing's neighbor

References

External links 
 
 Slalåm under himmelen at the National Library of Norway
 Slalåm under himmelen at Filmfront

1957 films
1950s Norwegian-language films
Norwegian drama films
1957 drama films